Mogneville is a commune in the Oise department in northern France.

History
Though inhabited from the Stone Age, the existence of the village first dates from the Romans. One of the merchants who followed Caesar and his camp to Catenoy, placed himself on the site of the modern village. The name of the village derives from the Latin Monnachivilla, "settlement of the monks", which is Moineville in French. Monks inhabited this territory in the 10th and 11th centuries. The Abbey of Chaalis, the Abbey of Lannoy and the Priory of Wariville  possessed benefices here.

Population

Sights
The Church of Saint-Denis is the oldest monument in the village of Mogneville. It was proclaimed a historic building by a decree of July 1937. The current building is a reconstruction of the XII  structure. First it was reconstructed into a Roman church, later on – into Gothic.

See also
Communes of the Oise department

References

External links

 Official website of Mogneville

Communes of Oise